Robert Carl Holland (April 17, 1925 – January 3, 2013) was an American economist who served as a member of the Federal Reserve Board of Governors from 1973 to 1976.

Born in Tekamah, Nebraska, Holland served in the United States Army during World War II. He received his bachelors, masters, and doctorate degrees from the University of Pennsylvania. He died from dementia in Centreville, Virginia.

Notes

External links
Statements and Speeches of Robert C. Holland

1925 births
2013 deaths
United States Army personnel of World War II
Deaths from dementia in Virginia
Economists from Nebraska
Federal Reserve System governors
Military personnel from Nebraska
People from Tekamah, Nebraska
United States Army soldiers
University of Pennsylvania alumni
Nixon administration personnel
Ford administration personnel
Federal Reserve economists